The 2017 AFL draft consisted of the various periods where the 18 clubs in the Australian Football League (AFL) traded and recruited players following the completion of the 2017 AFL season. Additions to each club's playing list are not allowed at any other time during the year.

The key dates for the trading and drafting periods:
The free agency offer period, held between 6 October and 18 October. Three further free agency periods were held for delisted players, between 1 November and 8 November, 10 November to 17 November, and 25 November to 26 November,
The trade period, held between 9 October and 19 October,
The 2017 national draft, held on 24 November, at the Sydney Showground Exhibition Centre, and included live bidding for academy and father-son selections.
The 2018 pre-season draft, held on 27 November, and
The 2018 rookie draft, also held on 27 November.

Player movements
The 2016 AFL draft included an initiative whereby clubs could trade future picks; through this scheme, twenty picks in the 2017 draft have already been traded.

Previous trades

Trades

Note 
The numbering of the draft picks in this list may be different to the agreed draft picks at the time of the trade, due to adjustments from either the insertion of free agency compensation draft picks or clubs exiting the draft before later rounds.

Free agency

Retirements and delistings

2017 national draft

As the Greater Western Sydney Giants were penalised 1,000 draft points by the AFL for the club's handling of Lachie Whitfield's attempt to avoid a potential drug test, their first round pick (pick 15) was moved back to pick 65.

Indicative draft order as of 19 October 2017

Rookie elevations
Clubs were able to promote any player who was listed on their rookie list in 2017 to their 2018 primary playing list prior to the draft.

2018 pre-season draft

The 2018 pre-season draft was the first to be held since 2014

2018 rookie draft

Category B rookie selections

During the trade period, clubs could nominate category B rookies to join their club.

See also
 2017 AFL Women's draft

Footnotes

 Port Adelaide initially received a second round compensation pick for losing Jackson Trengove through free agency, however, the compensation pick was withdrawn after the club signed Tom Rockliff as a free agent.

References

Australian Football League draft
Draft
AFL Draft
2010s in Sydney
Australian rules football in New South Wales
Sport in Sydney
Events in Sydney